Ramlal Parikh (1927–1999) was an Indian politician, a Member of Parliament, representing Gujarat in the Rajya Sabha the upper house of India's Parliament as a member of the Janata Party.

References

Rajya Sabha members from Gujarat
Janata Party politicians
1927 births
1999 deaths